Meret-Isesi (also Mereret-Isesi; "Beloved by Isesi") was a Princess of Egypt during the 5th Dynasty. Her father was Pharaoh Djedkare. Meret-Isesi appears as a King's daughter of his body in a relief which likely comes from Abusir.

The relief can be found on the Brooklyn Museum page for Mereret-Isesi. The caption identifies this princess as Kekheretnebti (she was a sister of Mereret-Isesi), but the text clearly identifies her as Mereret-Isesi.

References 

25th-century BC women
24th-century BC women
Princesses of the Fifth Dynasty of Egypt